The Primary School Leaving Examination (PSLE) (Malay: Peperiksaan Tamat Sekolah Rendah, Simplified Chinese: 小学离校考试 xiǎoxué lí xiào kǎoshì) is a national examination in Singapore that is administered by the Ministry of Education and taken by all students near the end of their sixth year in primary school before they move on to secondary school. The examination test students' proficiency in the English language, their respective mother tongue languages (typically Chinese, Malay or Tamil), mathematics and science. Students have not more than two hours to complete each subject paper except for certain components of language subjects. Students answering multiple choice questions by shading their responses on a standardised optical answer sheet (OAS) that uses optical mark recognition to detect answers or by writing their workings and/or answers on the question booklet itself for certain sections of the paper.

The format of the PSLE and the presence of it in the Singapore education system gives it a part in national culture. PSLE material has also been exported to other countries. Some schools abroad (such as National High Jakarta School in Jakarta, Indonesia), particularly in Southeast Asia, India and China, have their pupils sit the international version of the exam, the iPSLE, to provide a benchmark of their performance, compared to Singapore's standards.

In March 2018, calls for the removal of the PSLE was rejected in parliament by then Education Minister (Schools) Ng Chee Meng, who cited it as a "useful checkpoint" in a child's education journey. On 28 September 2018, Education Minister Ong Ye Kung reiterated his stance on keeping the
PSLE while announcing that the ministry will remove several mid-year and year-end exams across the board from primary one up to secondary four with the aim of reducing assessments based on exam results and to encourage students to be an all rounder.

History and past performance
The Primary School Leaving Examination (PSLE) was modeled after the British Eleven plus exam (11+) and was first conducted in 1960. Its predecessor was the Secondary School Entrance Examination (SSEE), which was conceived in 1952 when it was known as the Standard Six Entrance Examination up to 1954 and then as Secondary School Entrance Examination when the primary school classes were no longer named as Primary 1 & 2 and the standard 1 to 5 and started from Primary 1 to 6 instead. Promotion was to Form 2 in the secondary school instead of the previous Standard Six starting from January 1955, during the early days of self-government.

Though complaints were made about the 2007 PSLE Papers being out of syllabus and too challenging, this continued in the 2008 PSLE Paper.

Performance

In 2005, 51 087 pupils sat for the examination, a 0.4% increase from the previous year. The majority (or roughly 97.8%) of the pupils qualified for secondary school. 62.2% of those who passed were eligible for the Special (Integrated Programme or The International Baccalaureate) or the Express stream (Either one for 4 years only) and the remaining 35.6% were eligible for either the Normal (Academic) or Normal (Technical) courses (Either one for 5 years). 1163 pupils (2.3%) of the cohort assessed were not ready for secondary school in 2006 or were more suited for vocational training.

39,286 students sat for the PSLE in 2015. The Ministry of Education (MOE) said that a total of 38,610 students (98.3 %) were eligible for secondary school. 66.2 % of the pupils qualified for the Express stream, 21.7 % for Normal (Academic), and 10.4 % qualified for Normal (Technical). The remaining 1.7% did not qualify for the three streams and were offered choices to retake the examination or to move on to specialised vocational schools.

Controversy on flaws in papers

The 2005 mathematics paper for EM1 and EM2 (Example Method 1 and 2) students was flawed due to a question having no definite method of working the answer out. The "Question 13" was spotted by many and became infamous. The question was mathematically inconsistent in that one will get one set of answers when worked out one way and another set of answers when worked out by a different method. The Singapore Examinations and Assessment Board (SEAB) acknowledged the mistake a few days after the examination, annulling the question and awarding 2 marks to every student for the question.

Controversy on withholding of result slips 
In 2019, public debate arose concerning the practice of withholding PSLE result slips from students for failing to pay school fees. This ensued after news claiming that a student was withheld her PSLE result slip, due to being unable to pay school fees, circulated widely on social media. Subsequently, then Education Minister Ong Ye Kung asked for the Ministry of Education to re-evaluate the practice of withholding PSLE result slips from students due to unpaid school fees.

Other methods of admission to secondary schools
Students have the choice to go to other schools which do not use the posting system. Some of the top schools and the government schools have Direct School Admission (DSA). Some can go to other schools such as Singapore Sports School, NUS High School of Mathematics and Science or School of the Arts and School of Science and Technology.

Direct School Admission

Independent schools and Autonomous schools can admit up to 20% and 10% of their students via the Direct School Admission scheme (DSA) respectively. Students apply through exercises conducted by the schools around July and August, receiving notice of the results shortly after. Schools offering the Integrated Programme (IP) can take in as many students as they want via DSA. Other schools have also been granted permission by the Ministry of Education to take in students specialising in the schools' niche areas up to a maximum of 5% of their total student intake.

International schools
Since 2004, two international schools were given licenses to operate under the Ministry of Education's compulsory practices such as playing the national anthem, and following the nation's bilingual policies, to allow Singaporean or Singapore Permanent Resident students to enter without the Ministry of Education's permission. These schools were granted the permission in April 2004 and started the school year in January 2005. They are Anglo-Chinese School (International) and Hwa Chong International School. Another school was granted the permission to set up a school similar to the original two in 2006, the school is Saint Joseph's International School, which offers a similar programme to ACS (International).

Singapore Sports School

The Singapore Sports School is for students who are perceived by the school to excel in sports it offers. This includes swimming, badminton, table tennis, soccer, golf, track and field, netball and sailing. It was opened in January 2004 and the school takes students directly into the school provided they have an active background in the sports offered by the school. When the school had its first intake, many students applied who were judged to excel in their sport but were posted to the Normal (Academic) or Normal (Technical) streams. The school rejected these pupils as the school sought pupils who excelled both physically and academically. The school was criticised for being too result wise instead of grooming them into future sportspeople. Some of the students were finally accepted on an appeal basis after that. Students in the school aim for the International Baccalaureate (IB) paper, similar to the Singapore School Of the Arts.

NUS High School

The NUS High School of Mathematics and Science opened in 2005 with an intake of 225 Secondary 1 and 3 students, offering a six-year programme leading to the NUS High Diploma. Students will also sit for Advanced Placement (AP) and Scholastic Assessment Test (SAT) examinations in the senior years for benchmarks for admission into foreign universities. The school offers an accelerated mathematics and science curriculum based on a modular system, also offering languages, humanities, arts, and other elective subjects integrated into its modular system. Students are admitted based on several factors, performance in an application form, interviews, tests, and an admission camp.

School of Science and Technology, Singapore

The School of Science and Technology (SST) is located at Technology Drive, which is about five minutes walk from Dover MRT station. There is also a bus stop outside the school campus.

References

Geylang Methodist Primary School Revised PSLE format for English language – July 2005, URL accessed 24 November 2005.
Our Story Educating a nation – 1998, 2accessed 24 November 2005.
 "Welcome to P4 Parents' Briefing 2007" – March 2008, URL accessed 20 March, [2008]
PSLE Results Survey Report,  https://web.archive.org/web/20191115194233/http://educationcube.com/psle-results-survey-report

External links

 Primary School Leaving Examination on the SEAB website

Standardized tests
Education in Singapore